The Highland Wildcats is the brand of the Inverness Blitz Academy of American Football which is a registered charity with the Office of the Scottish Charity Regulator. The Inverness Blitz started in 1999 and since then has developed many teams and programmes in the area. In 2006 the Blitz gained charity status with the goals to increase public participation in sport and improve citizenship and community spirit through the use of American football. It was also at this time that the Blitz Development Project was established which saw the organisation employ a full-time development officer and run many programmes in primary schools, secondary schools and in volunteer & club development.
The Highland Wildcats was established by the Inverness Blitz in 2002 as a 14- to 16-year-old contact team. In 2008 the brand of the Highland Wildcats was expanded to cover all of the regional teams that represented the Inverness Blitz at a national level. During this their time in the National League the Highland Wildcats have won 8 Scottish Championships, 1 UK Flag Football Championship and 3 Youth UK Championship. 
The Highland Wildcats currently have a Youth team (13-16) and Junior team (16-19) competing in the British American Football Association National League (BAFANL). As well as this the Wildcats work in the community in schools and to develop volunteers. Notable current projects include Positive Life Pathways, Young Champions, the Highland Academy Community League and the Development Cadet Camps.

References

External links
 Highland Wildcats Official Website
American football teams in Scotland
Sport in Inverness
2002 establishments in Scotland
American football teams established in 2002